Min-young is a Korean unisex given name. Its meaning depends on the hanja used to write each syllable of the name. There are 27 hanja with the reading "min" and 34 hanja with the reading "young" on the South Korean government's official list of hanja which may be registered for use in given names.

People with this name include:
Lee Min-young (actress) (born 1976), South Korean actress
Park Min-young (born 1986), South Korean actress
Jennifer Song (born Song Min-young, 1989), American golfer
Min (Korean singer) (born Lee Min-young, 1991), South Korean female singer

Fictional characters with this name include:
Gong Min-young, in 2010 South Korean film Cyrano Agency and its spin-off 2013 television series Dating Agency: Cyrano
Ahn Min-young, in 2012 South Korean television series The Innocent Man
Noh Min-young, in 2013 South Korean television series All About My Romance

See also
List of Korean given names

References

Korean unisex given names